10 is the seventh studio album by New Kids on the Block. It was released on April 2, 2013. This is the band's first studio album since 2008's The Block, as well as their first album released independently after departing from Interscope Records. The album title refers to it being their tenth album release in the US (including compilation albums). The album made its debut on the Billboard 200 at number 6, number 1 on the Top Independent Albums and number 8 on the Canadian albums chart.

Background and development 
On January 22, 2013, the group appeared on The View and announced that they would release a new single titled "Remix (I Like The)" on January 28 and a new album titled 10 would be released on April 2, 2013. During the show, they also announced that they would tour with 98 Degrees and Boyz II Men as their opening acts in summer 2013. On February 6, the band released the official track listing for the album's standard edition on their official website.

They released the second single, "The Whisper" on August 1, 2013. The video features footage from The Package Tour.

Reception

Critical reception 
The album received mixed reviews from critics. Review aggregator Metacritic gave the album a score of 52 out of 100, indicating mixed or average reviews. The Huffington Post gave the album a positive review, complimenting its modern tastes, swaying hooks, and sensitive lyrics. Artistdirect gave the album 5 out of 5 stars, stating that the album feels unequivocally and undeniably "new". AllMusic reviewer Stephen Thomas Erlewine gave the album three stars out of five, calling it cleanly produced, tuneful, middle-of-the road pop. A negative review came from Idolator reviewer Mike Wass, who criticized the album's outdated dance pop and overwrought ballads, giving the album 2.5 out of 5 stars.

Commercial performance 
The album debuted at number 6 on the Billboard 200 in the United States, becoming the group's sixth top 10 ten album. 10 sold 48,000 copies in its first week, New Kids on the Block's second-best first-week sales since Nielsen SoundScan began tracking sales in 1991.

Track listing 
All songs produced by Deekay, except "Back to Life" and "Now or Never" produced by Brent Paschke, Gabe Lopez and Drew Ryan Scott.

Credits adapted from AllMusic.

Charts

References 

2013 albums
New Kids on the Block albums
Sony Music Entertainment Japan albums